Palatinate-Simmern-Kaiserslautern was a state of the Holy Roman Empire based in the Counties Palatine of Simmern and Kaiserslautern, and the Palatinian portion of the County of Sponheim in modern Rhineland-Palatinate, Germany.

Palatinate-Simmern-Kaiserslautern was created in 1610 from the partition of the Palatinate after the death of Frederick IV for his son Louis Philip. In 1673 Louis Philip's son and successor Louis Henry abandoned rulership of his territories to the Palatinate, and died heirless the next year.

House of Wittelsbach
Counties of the Holy Roman Empire
Former states and territories of Rhineland-Palatinate